Gerhard Heinz (born 9 September 1927) is an Austrian composer and pianist. He has worked on more than a hundred film scores during his career, including many sex comedies of the 1970s and various softcore erotic films.

Selected filmography
 No Kissing Under Water (1962)
 Help, I Love Twins (1969)
 When the Mad Aunts Arrive (1970)
 Rudi, Behave! (1971)
 The Reverend Turns a Blind Eye (1971)
 My Father, the Ape and I (1971)
 Aunt Trude from Buxtehude (1971)
 Einer spinnt immer (1971)
 Always Trouble with the Reverend (1972)
 Soft Shoulders, Sharp Curves (1972)
 Trouble with Trixie (1972)
 Cry of the Black Wolves (1972)
 Don't Get Angry (1972)
 Crazy – Completely Mad (1973)
 Blue Blooms the Gentian (1973)
 No Sin on the Alpine Pastures (1974)
 Alpine Glow in Dirndlrock (1974)
 The Maddest Car in the World (1975)
 Everyone Dies Alone (1976)
 Three Bavarians in Bangkok (1976)
 Vanessa (1977)
 Three Swedes in Upper Bavaria (1977)
 Popcorn and Ice Cream (1978)
 Love Hotel in Tyrol (1978)
 She's 19 and Ready (1979)
 Cola, Candy, Chocolate (1979)
 Bloody Moon (1981)
 Catherine Chérie (1982)
 Sunshine Reggae in Ibiza (1983)
 Die Supernasen (1983)

References

Bibliography
 Kristopher Spencer. Film and Television Scores, 1950-1979: A Critical Survey by Genre. McFarland, 2014.

External links
 

1927 births
Living people
Austrian composers
Musicians from Vienna